
Gmina Rusiec is a rural gmina (administrative district) in Bełchatów County, Łódź Voivodeship, in central Poland.

Villages
Gmina Rusiec contains the villages and settlements of Aleksandrów, Andrzejów, Annolesie, Antonina, Bolesławów, Dąbrowa, Dąbrowa Rusiecka, Dąbrówki Kobylańskie, Dębina, Dęby Wolskie, Dęby Wolskie-Kolonia, Fajnów, Jastrzębice, Koch, Korablew, Kurówek Prądzewski, Kuźnica, Leśniaki, Mierzynów, Nowa Wola, Pawłów, Prądzew, Rusiec, Wincentów, Wola Wiązowa, Zagrodniki, Zakurowie and Zalasy.

Neighbouring gminas
Gmina Rusiec is bordered by the gminas of Kiełczygłów, Konopnica, Osjaków, Rząśnia, Szczerców and Widawa.

References
Polish official population figures 2006

Rusiec
Bełchatów County